Omanosaura jayakari, the Jayakar lizard or Jayakar's Oman lizard, is a species of lizard in the family Lacertidae. It is found in Oman and the United Arab Emirates.

References

Omanosaura
Reptiles described in 1887
Taxa named by George Albert Boulenger
Reptiles of the Arabian Peninsula